Andrea Vivienne Boardman (born 6 November 1967 in Enfield, Middlesex) is an English television presenter.

History

In 1985, Boardman represented England in the Miss International 1985 pageant, held in Japan where she reached the semi-finals.

Boardman began presenting when ITV's Disney Club launched in the UK in 1988. She was given the role as female presenter after 2,000 hopefuls applied for the job. She went on to present Disney Adventures (ITV), Future Cooks (BBC1), Entertainment Express (BBC1), Live & Kicking (BBC1), Prize Time (Challenge TV), Entertainment Today (Talk TV) as well as producing/presenting her weekend breakfast show on Liberty Radio. Boardman has been a regular face on TV shows including National Lottery, You Bet, Comic Relief, Children in Need, Don't Try this at Home and many more. After a six-year break from TV to bring up her family, Boardman has recently appeared on Ready Steady Cook and Daybreak. In October 2011, along with her father Stan she appeared on Coach Trip

Personal life
Boardman is married with two children and is the daughter of Liverpudlian comedian Stan Boardman and twin sister to Sky Sports presenter and comedian Paul Boardman.

References

External links
 

1967 births
Living people
English television presenters
Television presenters from Liverpool
Miss International 1985 delegates